Crichton may refer to:

Places

Scotland
 Crichton, Midlothian, Scotland, which is also the site of
 Crichton Castle
 The Crichton, Dumfries, part of the University of Glasgow and other institutions
 Crichton Royal Hospital, part of Dumfries and Galloway Royal Infirmary
 Crichton F.C., a Dumfries football club

Canada
 Crichton, Saskatchewan, an unincorporated community in Canada
 Crichton Park, Nova Scotia, a neighborhood in Dartmouth, Nova Scotia, Canada

United States
 Crichton, Alabama, a neighborhood of Mobile
 Crichton, Louisiana, an unincorporated community, United States
 Crichton, West Virginia, an unincorporated community, United States
 Crichton College, a Christian liberal arts college in Memphis, Tennessee, United States

Fiction
 Robert Crichton (comics)
 John Crichton, a character of the television series Farscape
 Crichton, a robotic character in the television series Buck Rogers in the 25th Century

Shipbuilding
 Wm. Crichton & Co., a Finnish shipbuilding company (1842–1913)
 W. Crichton Shipyard (Okhta), a shipyard in Saint Petersburg, Russia (1897–1913)
 Crichton (Turku shipyard), a Finnish shipbuilding company (1914–1924)
 Crichton-Vulcan, a Finnish shipbuilding company and shipyard (1924–1989)
 J. Crichton & Company, a Welsh shipbuilding company (1913–1935)

Other uses
 Crichton Medal, awarded by the Essendon Football Club
 Crichton Award for Children's Book Illustration

People with the surname

Crichton
 Clan Crichton
 Lord Crichton
 Alexander Crichton of Brunstane (died c. 1558), Scottish supporter of the Protestant Reformation.
 Sir Alexander Crichton, (1763–1856), Scottish physician and author
 Andrew Crichton, (1790–1855), Scottish biographer and historian
 Charles Crichton (sailor), (1872–1958), British Olympic contestant
 Charles Crichton, (1910–1999), British film director
 David Crichton, (born 1983), professional skier from Canada
 George Crichton (bishop), (died ca. 1544), Bishop of Dunkeld
 Henry Crichton, 6th Earl Erne, (1937-2015), Irish peer
 James Crichton, (1560–1582), Scottish polymath, known as the "Admirable Crichton", after whom Barrie's play (see below) was named
 James Crichton, 1st Viscount Frendraught, (died ca. 1665), Scottish nobleman
 James Crichton (soldier) (1879–1961), Irish/New Zealand winner of the Victoria Cross
 Jesse Crichton, (born 1991), Australian rules footballer
 John Crichton, 3rd Earl Erne, (1802–1885), Anglo-Irish peer and politician
 John Crichton, 4th Earl Erne, (1839–1914), Anglo-Irish peer and politician
 John Crichton, 5th Earl Erne, (1907–1940), Anglo-Irish peer and politician
 Judy Crichton,  (1929–2007), documentary film-maker
 Leanne Crichton, (born 1987), Scottish footballer
 Loki Crichton, (born 1976), Samoan rugby player
 Michael Crichton, (1942–2008), American author
 Paul Crichton, (born 1968) English footballer
 Robert Crichton (bishop), (died 1585), Scottish Catholic cleric
 Robert Crichton (novelist), (1925–1993), American author
 Ronald Crichton, (1913–2005), English music critic
 Scott Crichton (judge) (born 1954), member of the Louisiana Supreme Court
 Scott Crichton (American football) (born 1991), American football defensive end 
 Scott Crichton (rugby union) (born 1954), New Zealand rugby union player
 William Crichton, 1st Lord Crichton (died 1454), Scottish Lord
 William Crichton (engineer), (1827–1889), Scottish engineer and shipbuilder
 Hugh Crichton-Miller, Scottish psychiatrist
 Iain Crichton Smith, Scottish author

Crichton-Stuart
 Anthony Crichton-Stuart, (born 1961), British art historian
 Augusta Crichton-Stuart, Marchioness of Bute, (1880–1947), British aristocrat
 James Crichton-Stuart (1824–1891), British soldier and politician.
 Lord Colum Crichton-Stuart, (1886–1957) British politician
 John Crichton-Stuart, 2nd Marquess of Bute, (1793–1848)
 John Patrick Crichton-Stuart, 3rd Marquess of Bute, (1847–1900)
 John Crichton-Stuart, 4th Marquess of Bute, (1881–1947)
 John Crichton-Stuart, 5th Marquess of Bute, (1907–1956)
 John Crichton-Stuart, 6th Marquess of Bute, (1933–1993)
 John Crichton-Stuart, 7th Marquess of Bute, (1958–2021)
 Ninian Crichton-Stuart, Keeper of Falkland Palace
 Lord Ninian Crichton-Stuart (1883–1915) British soldier and politician
 Lord Patrick Crichton-Stuart, (1794–1859), British politician
 Rhidian Crichton-Stuart, (1917–1969), British nobleman

See also
 The Admirable Crichton (disambiguation)
 Kryten, a character in Red Dwarf, modelled on the Barrie character
 Creighton (disambiguation)